Tiffen may refer to:
 Tiffen, English surname of Norman origin
 Tiffen (company), American filter manufacturer
 Tiffen, Carinthia, Austrian village